Carl Nilsson (18 May 1888 – 23 June 1915) was a Swedish long-distance runner. He competed in the marathon at the 1912 Summer Olympics. He finished 32nd in a time of 3:26:56.

References

External links
 

1888 births
1915 deaths
Athletes (track and field) at the 1912 Summer Olympics
Swedish male long-distance runners
Swedish male marathon runners
Olympic athletes of Sweden
Athletes from Stockholm